M. Narayanan (1 July 1956 - 9 November 2020) was an Indian politician of the Communist Party of India. He represented the Hosdurg constituency in 9th and 10th Kerala Legislative Assembly.

Narayanan died from COVID-19 in 2020.

References

1956 births
2020 deaths
Communist Party of India politicians from Kerala
Place of birth missing
Deaths from the COVID-19 pandemic in India
Kerala MLAs 2001–2006
Kerala MLAs 2006–2011
People from Kasaragod district